Street Supremacy is a racing video game developed by Genki and published by Konami in North America, Europe and Australia. It is part of the Tokyo Xtreme Racer series, despite not being named as such. It was released on April 21, 2005, in Japan, February 28, 2006, in North America, September 2006 in France and Oct 6, 2006 in Australia for the PlayStation Portable. It received poor reviews from critics, primarily citing its loading times and driving mechanics.

Reception 
The game received an aggregate score of 41/100 on Metacritic, indicating "generally unfavorable reviews".

Alex Navarro of GameSpot rated the game 4.5/10, praising the game's team battle mode but criticizing the loading times, driving gameplay and "broken" ad-hoc multiplayer mode, as well as the game's lack of free roam. 1Up.com gave the game a D+ rating, calling the game's life bar mechanic "pretty intense", but saying that the racing mechanics feel "like ice racing most of the time". Chris Roper of IGN rated the game 2.5/10, calling it "easily one of the worst racing games I've ever laid my hands on, bar none", and noting that the ad-hoc multiplayer was "completely and entirely nonfunctional", and that both racers became more and more out of sync as the race progressed.

Notes

References 

2005 video games
Konami games
Multiplayer and single-player video games
PlayStation Portable games
PlayStation Portable-only games
Racing video games
Tokyo Xtreme Racer
Video games set in Tokyo
Video games developed in Japan